Lac de Bious-Artigues is a lake in Pyrénées-Atlantiques, Pyrénées, France. At an elevation of 1416 m, its surface area is 0.326 km².

Lakes of Pyrénées-Atlantiques